Upper North Franklin Street Commercial District is a historic neighborhood in Tampa, Florida listed on the National Register of Historic Places listings in Hillsborough County, Florida. The area includes the Cafe Hey coffee shop, the Old Tampa Carnegie Free Library, (now a city office building), and the Rialto Theatre (Tampa) built in 1925 and now vacant.

The Arlington Hotel and Fly Bar have reinvigorated the national historic district. Other listed areas of the city include Tampa Heights, Seminole Heights, Ybor City, Hyde Park, Hampton Terrace, West Tampa and properties on Davis Island.

References

National Register of Historic Places in Tampa, Florida
Geography of Tampa, Florida
Historic districts on the National Register of Historic Places in Florida